Ogilvie Island is a patch of mud in San Francisco Bay. It is within the limits of the city of San Jose, in Santa Clara County, California, and named for county planner Arthur Ogilvie. It appears on a 2012 USGS map of the area.

References

Islands of Santa Clara County, California
Islands of San Francisco Bay
Islands of Northern California
Geography of San Jose, California